Come Again is the debut studio album by Canadian rock band Thornley. This followed the 2002 breakup of frontman Ian Thornley's previous group, Big Wreck. Singles off the album include "So Far So Good", "Come Again",  "Easy Comes", and "Beautiful". All of which found considerable radio airplay upon release.

Track listing

2007 [Special Edition]

Personnel
Adapted from the Come Again liner notes.

Thornley
 Ian Thornley – vocals, lead guitar
 Tavis Stanley – guitar, back-up vocals
 Ken Tizzard – bass, back-up vocals
 Sekou Lumumba – drums

Production
 Eric Ratz – engineer
 Steve Payne – second engineer
 Kenny Leung – second engineer
 Randy Staub – mixing 
 Rich Costey – mixing  
 Joey Moi – mixing  
 Misha Rajaratnam – assistant mixing
 Rob Stefanson – assistant mixing
 Claudius Mittendorfer – assistant mixing 
 Ryan Andersen – assistant mixing 
 George Marino – mastering 

Imagery
 Storm Thorgerson, Dan Abbott, Bill Thorgerson – cover
 Rupert Truman – package photography
 Michael Halsband – band photography
 Peter Curzon – logos, graphics

Charts

References

External links
 Thornley's Official MySpace

2004 debut albums
Thornley (band) albums
Albums produced by Gavin Brown (musician)
Albums with cover art by Storm Thorgerson